Edward Fabián Díaz Cárdenas (born 19 August 1994) is a Colombian professional racing cyclist, who is currently suspended from the sport after testing positive for continuous erythropoietin receptor activator (CERA) at the 2017 Vuelta a Colombia.

References

External links
 

1994 births
Living people
Colombian male cyclists
People from Nobsa
Sportspeople from Boyacá Department
21st-century Colombian people